Trithemis nigra is a species of dragonfly in the family Libellulidae. It is endemic to São Tomé and Príncipe. Its natural habitats are subtropical or tropical moist lowland forests and rivers. It is threatened by habitat loss.

References 

nigra
Taxonomy articles created by Polbot
Insects described in 1936